Brittany Alexandra Tiplady (born January 21, 1991) is a Canadian actress best known for her role as Jordan Black in the television series Millennium (1996–99). She won a 1998 Young Artist Award for Best Performance in a TV Drama Series – Supporting Actress. She also played the role of Maggie in the 2007 film Hot Rod.

At age nine, she played a supporting role in For All Time, as Mary Brown, the daughter of Newspaper Editor Mrs Laura Brown. 

Her brother Avery also performed on television and in a film while he was young.  His most recent role was in 2007.

References

External links

Childstarlets

1991 births
Canadian child actresses
Canadian film actresses
Canadian television actresses
Living people
People from Richmond, British Columbia
Actresses from British Columbia